Clare-Digby was a provincial electoral district in  Nova Scotia, Canada, that elected one member of the Nova Scotia House of Assembly. The riding was created in 2012 with 100 per cent of the former district of Clare and 76 per cent of the former district of Digby-Annapolis. It encompasses all of Digby County and consists of the Municipality of Clare, the Town of Digby, and the Municipality of the District of Digby. The riding is home to the province's only French-language university, Université Sainte-Anne at Church Point, and North America's oldest Acadian festival. Lobster and scallop catches in St. Mary's Bay and along the Fundy coast are critical to the economy.

Members of the Legislative Assembly
This riding has elected the following Members of the Legislative Assembly:

Election results

|-

|Liberal
|Gordon Wilson
|align="right"| 5,122
|align="right"| 54.68
|align="right"| N/A
|-

|Progressive Conservative
|Paul Emile LeBlanc
|align="right"| 2,911
|align="right"| 31.08
|align="right"| N/A
|-

|New Democratic Party
|Dean Kenley
|align="right"| 842
|align="right"| 8.99
|align="right"| N/A
|-

|Independent
|Ian Thurber
|align="right"| 492
|align="right"| 5.25
|align="right"| N/A
|-

|-
|}

References

External links
 2013 riding profile

Nova Scotia provincial electoral districts